Zamárdi is a town in Somogy County, Hungary. It is known for its beaches at Lake Balaton and for its music festivals during the summer (e.g. Strand Festival, Balaton Sound etc.).

The settlement is part of the Balatonboglár wine region.

Etymology
There are several explanations of the origin of the name of Zamárdi.
 According to one theory the village was called before the Mongol invasion Kis Szent Mártir which later changed to Zamárdi. However, there is no proof for that.
 The older part of the village is on the hill, so the residents brought water on the back of donkeys. Therefore, the village was called Szamárd after szamár and -d suffix.
 The most accepted theory states that the name derives from a person name Zamar or Somar. He could be the first owner of the village.

History
Before the arrival of the Hungarians at the turn of the 9th and 10th centuries, the area was populated by Avars. In 1972, a large Avaric cemetery was discovered in the village.

Notable people
Zoltán Kocsis, virtuoso pianist, conductor and composer

Twin towns – sister cities

Zamárdi is twinned with:
 Malsch, Germany
 Mošćenička Draga, Croatia
 Ustrzyki Dolne, Poland
 Vețca, Romania
 Villány, Hungary

References

External links
Official website
Street map (Hungarian)

Populated places in Somogy County
History of Somogy